The FIBA European Championship for Small Countries is the lowest-ranked tier of the biennial FIBA EuroBasket competition, organized by FIBA Europe.

History 
This championship was first introduced in 1988, as the Promotion Cup, the competition organized for the lowest ranked European national basketball teams. Since then, the competition has been held biannually. In 2007, the Promotion Cup was officially renamed EuroBasket Division C. 
In 2011, after the divisional system for the FIBA EuroBasket was abolished, the FIBA EuroBasket Division C was renamed to FIBA European Championship for Small Countries.

Results

Performance

Participation details

See also
FIBA Women's European Championship for Small Countries

References

External links 
 European Basketball Championship for Small Countries at FIBA Europe official website

 
Small Countries
1988 establishments in Europe
Recurring sporting events established in 1988